Little Falls Historic District is a national historic district located at Little Falls in Herkimer County, New York.  The district includes 347 contributing buildings in Little Falls.  The buildings date from the mid-19th to the early-20th century.  There are a number of Italianate-style commercial buildings and notable residences in popular 19th-century architectural styles including Federal, Greek Revival, Italianate, Second Empire, Queen Anne, and Colonial Revival. Notable non-residential buildings include the Masonic Temple (1914), East Park Elementary School, Public Library, and St. Mary's Catholic Church Complex. The separately listed James Sanders House is located in the district.

It was listed on the National Register of Historic Places in 2012. The Herkimer County Trust Company Building and James Sanders House are located in the district and are separately listed.

Photos

References

External links
 

Historic districts on the National Register of Historic Places in New York (state)
Buildings and structures in Herkimer County, New York
National Register of Historic Places in Herkimer County, New York